The 1961 pattern webbing equipment was issued to the South African army and the Rhodesian army as the 69 pattern webbing. It was based on the British 1958 pattern.

See also
List of webbing equipment
1970 pattern webbing, South African equivalent

Personal military carrying equipment